Silvio Caiozzi (born 1944) is a Chilean film director and cinematographer.

Select filmography
 A la sombra del sol (1974)
 Julio comienza en julio (1979)
 La luna en el espejo  (1990)
 Fernando ha vuelto (1998)
 Coronación (2000)
 Cachimba (2004)
 Y de pronto el amanecer (2017)

Awards 
Grand Prix des Amériques for Y de pronto el amanecer (And suddenly the dawn), 2017

References

External links

living people
1944 births
Chilean film directors
Chilean cinematographers